Luis Pericot Garcia (2 September 1899 – 12 October 1978) was a Spanish archaeologist and historian, specializing in prehistory. He was President of the PanAfrican Archaeological Association from 1963 to 1967.

References 

1899 births
1978 deaths
20th-century Spanish archaeologists
Corresponding Fellows of the British Academy